Ginaud Dupuis (born 11 September 1964) is a French-Canadian strongman, notable for twice appearance at the World's Strongest Man.

Strength athlete career 
Dupuis started his career as a powerlifter, becoming a WPA World Champion in 1994 (under 140 kg category, equipped division). After that, he started to compete in strongman, placed twelfth at 1995 World Strongman Challenge.

In 1997, he wins the title of Canada's Strongest Man and invited to compete at the World's Strongest Man. At 1998 World's Strongest Man, he appears with peak bodyweight of 138 kg.  

In 2000, Dupuis placed fourth at the Canada's Strongest Man and retired from the strength sports.  

In 2001, he plays role of a strong man in Alegría, Cirque du Soleil touring production. After that, Dupuis went on service in Canada's army.

Outside of strongman, Ginaud worked as powerlifting coach in Aylmer and helps to Canadian filmmaker and mountaineer Elia Saikaly find himself in life.

References 

1964 births
Living people
Canadian strength athletes